In mathematics, Lafforgue's theorem, due to Laurent Lafforgue, completes the Langlands program for general linear groups over algebraic function fields, by giving a correspondence between automorphic forms on these groups and representations of Galois groups. 

Langlands conjectures for GL1
The  Langlands conjectures for GL1(K) follow from (and are essentially equivalent to)   class field theory. More precisely the Artin map gives a map from the idele class group  to the abelianization of the Weil group.

Automorphic representations of GLn(F)
The representations of GLn(F) appearing in the Langlands correspondence are automorphic representations.

Lafforgue's theorem for GLn(F)
Here F is a global field of some positive characteristic p, and ℓ is some prime not equal to p.

Lafforgue's theorem states that there is a bijection σ between:
Equivalence classes of cuspidal representations π of GLn(F), and
Equivalence classes of irreducible ℓ-adic representations σ(π) of dimension n of the absolute Galois group of F
that preserves the L-function at every place of F.

The proof of Lafforgue's theorem involves constructing a representation  σ(π) of the absolute Galois group for each cuspidal representation π. The idea of doing this is to look in the ℓ-adic cohomology of the moduli stack of shtukas of rank n that have compatible level N structures for all N. The cohomology contains subquotients of the form 
π⊗σ(π)⊗σ(π)∨
which can be used to construct σ(π) from π. A major problem is that the moduli stack is not of finite type, which means that there are formidable technical difficulties in studying its cohomology.

Applications
Lafforgue's theorem implies the Ramanujan–Petersson conjecture that if an automorphic form for GLn(F) has central character of finite order, then the corresponding Hecke eigenvalues at every unramified place have absolute value 1.

Lafforgue's theorem implies the conjecture of   that an irreducible finite-dimensional l-adic representation of the absolute Galois group with determinant character of finite order is pure of weight 0.

See also
Local Langlands conjectures

References

 Lafforgue, Laurent (2002), "Chtoucas de Drinfeld, formule des traces d'Arthur-Selberg et correspondance de Langlands." (Drinfeld shtukas, Arthur-Selberg trace formula and Langlands correspondence)  Proceedings of the International Congress of Mathematicians, Vol. I (Beijing, 2002), 383–400, Higher Ed. Press, Beijing, 2002.

Gérard Laumon (2002), "The work of Laurent Lafforgue", Proceedings of the ICM, Beijing 2002, vol. 1, 91–97,
G. Laumon (2000), "La correspondance de Langlands sur les corps de fonctions (d'après Laurent Lafforgue)" (The Langlands correspondence over function fields (according to Laurent Lafforgue)), Séminaire Bourbaki, 52e année, 1999–2000, no. 873.

External links
Lafforgue's publications
The work of Robert Langlands 

Theorems in algebraic number theory
Representation theory of Lie groups
Automorphic forms
Conjectures
Class field theory
Langlands program
Theorems in representation theory